Sanna Nymalm (born 1972) is a Finnish orienteering competitor. She received a silver medal in the relay event at the 1999 World Orienteering Championships in Inverness, together with Reeta-Mari Kolkkala, Kirsi Tiira and Johanna Asklöf. She finished 4th in the short distance at the 1999 World championship.

See also
 Finnish orienteers
 List of orienteers
 List of orienteering events

References

External links

1972 births
Living people
Finnish orienteers
Female orienteers
Foot orienteers
World Orienteering Championships medalists
Swedish-speaking Finns